A resistance movement is an organized group of people that tries to resist the government or an occupying power, causing disruption and unrest in civil order and stability. Such a movement may seek to achieve its goals through either the use of nonviolent resistance (sometimes called civil resistance), or the use of force, whether armed or unarmed. In many cases, as for example in the United States during the American Revolution, or in Norway in the Second World War, a resistance movement may employ both violent and non-violent methods, usually operating under different organizations and acting in different phases or geographical areas within a country.

Etymology
The Oxford English Dictionary records use of the word "resistance" in the sense of organised opposition to an invader from 1862. The modern usage of the term "Resistance" became widespread from the self-designation of many movements during World War II, especially the French Resistance. The term is still strongly linked to the context of the events of 1939–45, and particularly to opposition movements in Axis-occupied countries. Using the term "resistance" to designate a movement meeting the definition prior to World War II might be considered by some to be an anachronism. However, such movements existed prior to World War II (albeit often called by different names), and there have been many after it for example in struggles against colonialism and foreign military occupations. "Resistance" has become a generic term that has been used to designate underground resistance movements in any country.

Background

Resistance movements can include any irregular armed force that rises up against an enforced or established authority, government, or administration. This frequently includes groups that consider themselves to be resisting tyranny or dictatorship. Some resistance movements are underground organizations engaged in a struggle for national liberation in a country under military occupation or totalitarian domination. Tactics of resistance movements against a constituted authority range from nonviolent resistance and civil disobedience, to guerrilla warfare and terrorism, or even conventional warfare if the resistance movement is powerful enough. Any government facing violent acts from a resistance movement usually condemns such acts as terrorism, even when such attacks target only the military or security forces. Resistance during World War II was mainly dedicated to fighting the Axis occupiers. Germany itself also had an anti-Nazi German resistance movement in this period. Although the United Kingdom did not suffer invasion in World War II, preparations were made for a British resistance movement in the event of a German invasion (see Auxiliary Units).

Geographies of resistance

When geographies of resistance are discussed, it is often taken for granted that resistance takes place where domination, power, or oppression occurs and so resistance is often understood as something that always opposes to power or domination. However, some scholars believe and argue that looking at resistance in relation to only power and domination does not provide a full understanding of the actual nature of resistance. Not all power, domination, or oppression leads to resistance, and not all cases of resistance are against or to oppose what is categorized as "power". In fact, they believe that resistance has its own characteristics and spatialities. In Steve Pile's (1997) "Opposition, Political Identities and Spaces of Resistance," geographies of resistance show:

We can better understand resistance by accounting different perspectives and by breaking the presumptions that resistance is always against power. In fact, resistance should be understood not only in relations to domination and authority, but also through other experiences, such as "desire and anger, capacity and ability, happiness and fear, dreaming and forgetting", meaning that resistance is not always about the dominated versus the dominator, the exploited versus the exploiter, or the oppressed versus the oppressor. There are various forms of resistance for various reasons, which then can be, again, classified as violent and nonviolent resistance (and "other" which is unclear).

Different geographical spaces can also make different forms of resistance possible or impossible and more effective or less effective. Furthermore, in order to understand any resistance its capacity to achieve its objective effectively, its success or failure we need to take closely into account many variables, such as political identities, cultural identities, class, race, gender and so on. The reason is that these variations can define the nature and outcome of resistance. Harvey (1993), who looked at resistance in relations to capitalist economic exploitation, took on a fire accident happened in the Imperial Foods chicken processing plant in Hamlet, North Carolina in 1991, in which 20 of 200 workers were killed and 56 were injured due to poor working conditions and protections. He compared this accident with a similar fire accident at Triangle Shirtwaist Company, New York, 1911, killing 146 workers, which caused a labor resistance by 100,000 people. He argued that no resistance took place in response to the fire accident in Hamlet because most of the people who died there were black and women workers, and he believed that not only class but also other identities such as race, gender, and sexuality were important factors in understanding nature and outcome of resistance. For an effective resistance, he proposed that four tasks should be undertaken:

There are many forms of resistance in relations to different power dominations and actors. Some resistance takes place in order to oppose, change, or reform the exploitation of the capitalist economic systems and the capitals, while other resistance takes place against the state or authority in power. Moreover, some other resistance takes place in order to resist or question the social/culture norms or discourse or in order to challenge a global trend called "globalization". For example, LGBT social movements is an example of resistance that challenges and tries to reform the existing cultural norms in many societies. Resistance can also be mapped in various scales ranging from local to national to regional and to global spaces. We can look at a big-scale resistance movement such as anti-globalization movement that tries to resist the global trend of capitalist economic system. Or we can look at the internal resistance to apartheid, which took place at national level. Most, if not all, social movements can be considered as some forms of resistance.

Not all resistance takes place in physical spaces or geographies but in "other spaces" as well. Some resistance happens in the form of Protest Art or in the form of music. Music can be used and has been used as a tool or space to resist certain oppression or domination. Gray-Rosendale, L. (2001) put it this way:

In the age of advanced IT and mass consumption of social media, resistance can also occur in the cyberspace. The Aboriginal Health and Medical Research Council of NSW's Tobacco Resistance and Control (A-TRAC) team created a Facebook page to help promote anti-smoking campaign and rise awareness for its members. Sometimes, resistance takes place in people's minds and ideology or in people's "inner spaces". For example, sometimes people have to struggle within or fight against their inner spaces, with their consciousness and, sometimes, with their fear before they can resist in the physical spaces. In other cases, people sometimes simply resist to certain ideology, belief, or culture norms within their minds. These kinds of resistance are less visible but very fundamental parts of all forms of resistance.

Controversy regarding definition

On the lawfulness of armed resistance movements in international law, there has been a dispute between states since at least 1899, when the first major codification of the laws of war in the form of a series of international treaties took place. In the Preamble to the 1899 Hague Convention II on Land War, the Martens Clause was introduced as a compromise wording for the dispute between the Great Powers who considered francs-tireurs to be unlawful combatants subject to execution on capture and smaller states who maintained that they should be considered lawful combatants.

More recently the 1977 Protocol Additional to the Geneva Conventions of 12 August 1949, and relating to the Protection of Victims of International Armed Conflicts, referred in Article 1. Paragraph 4 to armed conflicts "... in which peoples are fighting against colonial domination and alien occupation and against racist regimes..." This phraseology, according USA that refused to ratify the Protocol, contains many ambiguities that cloud the issue of who is or is not a legitimate combatant: ultimately, in US Government opinion the distinction is just a political judgment.

By the way, some definitions of resistance movement have proved controversial. 
Hence depending on the perspective of a state's government, a resistance movement may or may not be labelled a terrorist group based on whether the members of a resistance movement are considered lawful or unlawful combatants and whether they are recognized as having a right to resist occupation.

According to Joint Publication 1-02, the United States Department of Defense defines a resistance movement as "an organized effort by some portion of the civil population of a country to resist the legally established government or an occupying power and to disrupt civil order and stability". In strict military terminology, a resistance movement is simply that; it seeks to resist (change) the policies of a government or occupying power. This may be accomplished through violent or non-violent means. In this view, a resistance movement is specifically limited to changing the nature of current power, not to overthrow it; and the correct military term for removing or overthrowing a government is an insurgency. However, in reality many resistance movements have aimed to displace a particular ruler, especially if that ruler has gained or retained power illegally.

Freedom fighter

Freedom fighter is another term for those engaged in a struggle to achieve political freedom for themselves or obtain freedom for others. Though the literal meaning of the words could include "anyone who fights for the cause of freedom", in common use it may be restricted to those who are actively involved in an armed rebellion, rather than those who campaign for freedom by peaceful means, or those who fight violently for the freedom of others outside the context of an uprising (though this title may be applied in its literal sense)

Generally speaking, freedom fighters are people who use physical force to cause a change in the political and or social order. Notable examples include Umkhonto we Sizwe in South Africa, the Sons of Liberty in the American Revolution, the Irish Republican Army in Ireland and Northern Ireland, the Eritrean People's Liberation Front, and the National Resistance Army in Uganda, which were considered freedom fighters by supporters. However, a person who is campaigning for freedom through peaceful means may still be classed as a freedom fighter, though in common usage they are called political activists, as in the case of the Black Consciousness Movement. In India, "Freedom fighter" is an officially recognized category by the Indian government covering those who took part in the country's independence movement; people in this category (can also include dependant family members) get pensions and other benefits like special railway counters.

People described as freedom fighters are often also called assassins, rebels, insurgents or terrorists. This leads to the aphorism "one man's terrorist is another man's freedom fighter". The degree to which this occurs depends on a variety of factors specific to the struggle in which a given freedom fighter group is engaged.

During the Cold War, the term freedom fighter was first used with reference to the Hungarian rebels in 1956. Ronald Reagan picked up the term to explain America's support of rebels in countries controlled by communist states or otherwise perceived to be under the influence of the Soviet Union, including the Contras in Nicaragua, UNITA in Angola and the multi-factional mujahideen in Afghanistan.

In the media, the BBC tries to avoid the phrases "terrorist" or "freedom fighter", except in attributed quotes, in favor of more neutral terms such as "militant", "guerrilla", "assassin", "insurgent", "rebel", "paramilitary", or "militia".

Common weapons

Partisans often use captured weapons taken from their enemies, or weapons that have been stolen or smuggled in. During the Cold War, partisans often received arms from either NATO or Warsaw Pact member states. Where partisan resources are stretched, improvised weapons are also deployed.

Examples of resistance movements
The following examples are of groups that have been considered or would identify themselves as groups. These are mostly, but not exclusively, of armed resistance movements. For movements and phases of activity involving non-violent methods, see civil resistance and nonviolent resistance.

Pre–20th century
 The Sicarii were a first-century Jewish movement opposing Roman occupation of the Jewish Promised Land.
 The Yellow Turbans were peasant rebels against the Eastern Han dynasty, led by Zhang Jue, was crushed by the lack of co-ordination with other Yellow Turban groups as well as destabilization.
 The Abbasid Revolution overthrow of the Umayyad dynasty under Abu Muslim, which was caused by discrimination against non-Arab Muslims and government corruption.
 The Mamluks were Turkic slaves who overthrew the Ayyubid dynasty.
 In opposition to British rule in Ireland and the subsequent Plantations of Ireland, the native Gaelic population, at times with and against the Hiberno-Normans lords, launched the Bruce campaign in Ireland (1315-1318), the Desmond Rebellions (1569–1573 & 1579–1583), the  Nine Years' War, also known as Tyrone's Rebellion, (1593-1603), the Irish Rebellion of 1641 & the subsequent Irish Confederate Wars (1641-1653), the Williamite War in Ireland (1688–1691), the Irish Rebellion of 1798, also known as the United Irishmen Rebellion, and the Tithe War (1831-1836).
 The Jacobite risings were a series of rebellions, uprisings, and wars to reinstate the Stuart dynasty.
 The American Continental forces of the American Revolutionary War were essentially a resistance movement against the British Empire.
 Francis Marion was an American Revolutionary War partisan who led a partisan guerrilla movement against Great Britain.
 Indigenous Australians in the early history of Australia
 Pemulwuy – An indigenous Australian who resisted the European colonization of Australia. In 1797, a state of guerrilla warfare existed between indigenous people and settler communities in Sydney. The Aboriginals were led by Pemulwuy, a member of the Bidjigal tribe who occupied the land. Pemulwuy was eventually shot and killed by Henry Hacking in 1802.
 Jandamarra – The first Indigenous Australian to use firearms and conduct organized warfare in battle against settlers; leading a war against Euro-Australian settlers for three years, from 1894 to 1897. The resistance movement ended when Jandamarra was shot dead by an Aboriginal tracker.
 Resistance movements against France also emerged during the Napoleonic Wars
 The 1808 invasion of Spain by Bonaparte sparked a resistance movement composed mostly of the lower classes, who felt that the nobility was simply allowing themselves to fall under French control. Lord Wellington remarked that it was extraordinary that the French had managed to remain in the country for so long (about 4 years).
 Landsturm – German resistance groups fighting against the French in the Napoleonic Wars.
 Certain Native Americans during Manifest destiny.
 Tsali – Cherokee tribal member who led a small band of Cherokee people against the United States military during the Trail of Tears era. Executed in exchange for the survival of his band, the band were integrated into the Eastern Band of Cherokee Indians.
 Osceola – Seminole chief who was very influential. Resisted deportation during the period of Indian removal. Led a number of successes until being captured by the United States during faux peace talks, died a few months later in prison.
 During the American Civil War, there were also resistance movements on both sides
 Bushwhackers were Confederate guerrillas who engaged in raids, robberies, and massacres against the Union forces and affiliated citizens. Continued resisting for some years after the American Civil War ended. Responsible for the Lawrence Massacre
 Jayhawkers were Union guerrillas who engaged in the same acts as the bushwhackers did, they were also active during Bleeding Kansas, most prominent member was John Brown responsible for the Pottawatomie Massacre and John Brown's raid on Harper's Ferry.
 Carbonari – 19th-century Italian movement resisting Austrian or Bourbon rule.
 The Polish National Government – Underground Polish supreme authority during the January Uprising against Russian occupation of Poland. In 1863–1864, it was a real shadow government supported by majority of Poles, who even paid taxes for it, and was a significant problem for the Okhrana, the secret police of the Russian Empire.
 Andrés Avelino Cáceres' resistance movement against invading Chilean forces during the War of the Pacific.
 The Kataas-Taasang, Ka-Galang-galangang, Katipunan ng mga Anak Ng Bayan (KKK) was an organization in the Philippines that instigated the Philippine Revolution in 1896 against the Spanish colonials and resulted in the dissolution of the Republic of Biak na Bato and the exile of the Philippine Government, headed by Emillo Aguinaldo.

Pre–World War II
 Filipino guerrilla units after official end of Philippine–American War (1902–1913)
 Chinese Communist Party
 Chinese Red Army
 Chinese Soviet Republic
 Communist-controlled China (1927–1949)
 Fujian People's Government
 Shaan-Gan-Ning Border Region
 Charlemagne Peralte and his Cacos rebels who resisted the United States occupation of Haiti.
 Freikorps
 Ukrainian forces in the Ukrainian War of Independence (1917-1921)
 Forest Guerrillas (1921–1922)
 Jewish paramilitary organizations that resisted the British authorities in Palestine (1920s until 1948) prior to the founding of the State of Israel include the Haganah, the Irgun, and Lehi.
 Augusto César Sandino led a rebellion against the United States occupation of Nicaragua.
 Lwów Eaglets
 Black Lions (1936)
 Irish Republican Army (1918–1922)
 Turkish national movement
 Association for the Defense of the Rights of Anatolia and Rumelia
 TIGR (1927–1941)
 Ustaše – Croatian nationalist and fascist resistance movement against the Kingdom of Yugoslavia
 White movement
 National Alliance of Russian Solidarists

World War II

 Albanian resistance movement
 Austrian resistance movement (O5)
 Belgian resistance movement
 British resistance movements
 SIS Section D and Section VII (planned Resistance organisations)
 Resistance in the German-occupied Channel Islands
 The Auxiliary Units, organized by Colonel Colin Gubbins as a potential British resistance movement against a possible invasion of the British Isles by Nazi forces, note that it was the only resistance movement established prior to invasion, albeit the invasion never came.
 Bulgarian resistance movement
 Burmese resistance movement
 Chechen anti-Soviet resistance
 Chinese resistance movements
 Anti-Japanese Army for the Salvation of the Country
 Chinese People's National Salvation Army
 Heilungkiang National Salvation Army
 Jilin Self-Defence Army
 Northeast Anti-Japanese National Salvation Army
 Northeast Anti-Japanese United Army
 Northeast People's Anti-Japanese Volunteer Army
 Northeastern Loyal and Brave Army
 Northeastern People's Revolutionary Army
 Northeastern Volunteer Righteous & Brave Fighters
 Hong Kong resistance movements
  (Hong Kong-Kowloon big army)
 East River Column (Dongjiang Guerrillas, Southern China and Hong Kong organisation)
 Chinese Muslims in the Second Sino-Japanese War
 Muslim Detachment (回民義勇隊 Huimin Zhidui)
 Muslim corps
 Czech Resistance movement
 Danish resistance movement
 Dutch resistance movement
 The Stijkel Group, a Dutch resistance movement, which mainly operated around the S-Gravenhage area.
 Valkenburg resistance
 Estonian resistance movement
 Forest Brothers
 French resistance movement
 Bureau Central de Renseignements et d'Action (BCRA)
 Conseil National de la Résistance (CNR)
 Francs-Tireurs et Partisans (FTP)
 Free French Forces (FFL)
 French Forces of the Interior (FFI)
 Maquis
 Pat O'Leary Line
 German resistance to Nazism
 Bästlein-Jacob-Abshagen Group
 Confessing Church
 Edelweiss Pirates
 Ehrenfeld Group
 European Union
 Kreisau Circle
 National Committee for a Free Germany
 Anti-Fascist Committee for a Free Germany
 Neu Beginnen
 Red Orchestra
 Robert Uhrig Group
 Saefkow-Jacob-Bästlein Organization
 Solf Circle
 Vierergruppen in Hamburg, Munich and Vienna
 White Rose
 German pro-Nazi resistance
 Volkssturm – a German resistance group and militia created by the NSDAP near the end of World War II
 Werwolf – German guerrillas resisting Allied occupation of Germany, 1945
 Greek resistance movement
 List of Greek Resistance organizations
 Cretan resistance
 National Liberation Front (EAM) and the Greek People's Liberation Army (ELAS), EAM's guerrilla forces
 National Republican Greek League (EDES)
 National and Social Liberation (EKKA)
 Indian resistance movements:
 Quit India Movement, largely non-violent anti-British resistance within Indian territory
 Azad Hind
 Indian National Army, Indian force fighting alongside Imperial Japan against Allied forces
 Free Indian Army, Indian unit in Nazi Germany fighting against the Allies for India's Independence
 Italian resistance against fascism
 Arditi del Popolo
 Assisi Network
 Brigate Fiamme Verdi
 Comitato di Liberazione Nazionale
 Concentrazione Antifascista Italiana
 DELASEM
 Democrazia Cristiana
 Four days of Naples
 Giustizia e Libertà
 Italian Civil War
 Italian Co-Belligerent Army, Navy, and Air Force
 Italian Communist Party (PCI)
 Italian Partisan Republics
 Italian Socialist Party (PSI)
 Labour Democratic Party (PDL)
 Movimento Comunista d'Italia
 National Liberation Committee for Northern Italy
 Partito d'Azione
 Scintilla
 Italian pro-fascist resistance
 Black Brigades
 Italian guerrilla war in Ethiopia
 Japanese anti-imperial resistance
 Dissent in the Armed Forces of the Empire of Japan
 Japanese in the Chinese resistance to the Empire of Japan
 Japanese Communist Party
 Japanese People's Emancipation League
 Japanese People's Anti-war Alliance
 League to Raise the Political Consciousness of Japanese Troops
 Japanese pro-imperial resistance
 Japanese holdout
 Volunteer Fighting Corps
 Jewish resistance movement, including Jewish partisans and Jewish Anti-Fascist Committee
 Resistance movement in Auschwitz
 Korean resistance movement
 Provisional Government of the Republic of Korea
 Korean Liberation Army
 Korean Volunteer Army
 Latvian resistance movement
 Lithuanian resistance
 Lithuanian, Latvian, and Estonian (Forest Brothers, Latvian national partisans, and Lithuanian partisans) resistance movements during the Soviet invasion and occupation of the Baltic countries (continued after the end of World War II).
 Luxembourgish resistance movement
 Norwegian resistance movement
 Philippine resistance movement (Multiple, often opposing organizations, were active during the Japanese Occupation)
 Polish Underground State and Polish resistance organizations, such as:
 Armia Krajowa (the Home Army), Polish underground army in World War II (400 000 sworn members)
 Narodowe Siły Zbrojne
 Bataliony Chłopskie
 Gwardia Ludowa (the People's Guard) and Armia Ludowa (the People's Army)
 Żydowska Organizacja Bojowa (ZOB, the Jewish Fighting Organisation), Jewish resistance movement that led the Warsaw Ghetto Uprising in 1943
 Zydowski Zwiazek Walki (ZZW, the Jewish Fighting Union), Jewish resistance movement that led the Warsaw Ghetto Uprising in 1943
 Russian pro-Nazi German collaborationist movement
 Anti-Soviet partisans
 Committee for the Liberation of the Peoples of Russia (Russian pro-Nazi German collaborationist resistance movement)
 Russian Liberation Army
 GULAG Operation
 Lokot Autonomy
 Russian Fascist Party
 Russian Liberation Movement
 Union for the Struggle for the Liberation of the Peoples of Russia
 White movement members within pro-Nazi circles
 Slovak resistance movement
 Soviet resistance movement of Soviet partisans and underground which had Moscow-organized and spontaneously-formed cells opposing German occupation.
 Belarusian Soviet partisans
 Estonian Soviet partisans
 Latvian Soviet partisans
 Moldovan Soviet partisans
 Soviet partisans in Finland
 Soviet partisans in Poland
 Young Guard (Soviet resistance)
 Thai resistance movement
 Ukrainian resistance movements:
 Ukrainian Insurgent Army (anti-German, anti-Soviet and anti-Polish resistance movement)
 Ukrainian People's Revolutionary Army (anti-German, anti-Soviet and anti-Polish resistance movement)
 Yugoslav resistance movements:
 Yugoslav Army in the Homeland - the Chetniks
 Blue Guard – Slovenian Chetniks
 National Liberation Army – the Partisans
 Croatian Partisans
 Macedonian Partisans
 Serbian Partisans
 Slovene Partisans
 Viet Minh

Post–World War II
 Post-WWII anti-fascism (ongoing)

Africa

 Casamance conflict (ongoing)
 Conflict in the Niger Delta (ongoing)
 Front for the Liberation of the Enclave of Cabinda (Frente para a Libertação do Enclave de Cabinda) (ongoing)
 Harakat al-Shabaab Mujahideen (ongoing)
 Lord's Resistance Army (ongoing)
 Mai-Mai (ongoing)
 March 23 Movement
 Mau Mau
 MPLA
 Ogaden National Liberation Front
 Sudanese resistance (ongoing)
 Symbionese Liberation Army
 Umkhonto we Sizwe/African National Congress
 ZANU–PF

East Asia, Southeast Asia, and Oceania

 East Turkestan Islamic Movement (ongoing)
 Free Papua Movement (ongoing)
 Kuomintang insurgency in China
 Kuomintang Islamic insurgency
 Kuomintang in Burma
 New People's Army (ongoing)
 Pathet Lao
 People's Liberation Army/Chinese Communist Party
 South Thailand insurgency (ongoing)
 Tibetan resistance movement (ongoing)
 Viet Cong
 Viet Minh

Europe

 Albanian insurgency in Yugoslavia
 Kosovo Liberation Army
 Kosovo Protection Corps
 National Liberation Army
 Liberation Army of Preševo, Medveđa and Bujanovac
 Anti-communist resistance in Poland
 Caucasus Emirate 
 Continuity Irish Republican Army
 Crusaders – Croatian Ustaše guerrilla movement fighting against Yugoslav communist forces
 Cursed soldiers Polish anticommunist resistance
 Free Wales Army
 Greek resistance
 Hungarian Uprising
 Irish National Liberation Army
 Irish People's Liberation Organisation
 Irish Republican Army
 Insurgency in the North Caucasus (2009-2017)
 Mudiad Amddiffyn Cymru
 National Liberation Front of Corsica (Fronte di Liberazione Naziunale Corsu)
 Óglaigh na hÉireann (ongoing)
 Prague Spring
 Provisional Irish Republican Army (1969–1997)
 Real Irish Republican Army (ongoing)
 Romanian anti-communist resistance movement
 Spanish Maquis
 Ukrainian resistance during the 2022 Russian invasion of Ukraine (ongoing)
 United Irishmen

Middle East

 Armenian resistance
 Free Patriotic Movement (1988-2005)
 Free Syrian Army (2011-2014; Splinter branches and groups who use the name ongoing)
 Front for the Liberation of the Golan (ongoing)
 General Military Council for Iraqi Revolutionaries (ongoing)
 Gaddafi loyalism (ongoing)
 Insurgency in the Maghreb (2002–present) (ongoing)
 Iraqi insurgency (2003–2011)
 Taliban (2001 to 2021)
 Islamic Republic of Afghanistan (ongoing)
 National Resistance Front of Afghanistan
 Hezbollah (ongoing)
 Houthis (Ansar Allah) (ongoing)
 Popular Mobilization Forces
 Lebanese Front/Lebanese Forces (1975–1990)
 National Liberation Front (Algeria)
 Palestinian militants (ongoing)
 Al Aqsa Martyrs Brigade
 Democratic Front for the Liberation of Palestine
 Hamas (ongoing)
 Palestinian Islamic Jihad (ongoing)
 Palestine Liberation Organization (ongoing)
 Popular Front for the Liberation of Palestine (ongoing)
 Polisario Front (ongoing)
 People's Mujahedin Organization of Iran
 South Yemen Movement (ongoing)

Indian subcontinent

 Mukti Bahini (1971)
 Bhutan Tiger Force
 Indian Independence movement and Pakistan movement
 Insurgency in Jammu and Kashmir  (ongoing)
 Khalistan 
 Sindhudesh (ongoing)
 Tamil Tigers

Western hemisphere

 American Indian Movement
 Black Guerrilla Family (ongoing)
 Black Panther Party
 Boricua Popular Army
 Contras of Nicaragua
 Farabundo Marti National Liberation Front
 Revolutionary Armed Forces of Colombia (ongoing)
 Front de libération du Québec
 Fruit of Islam
 Fuerzas Armadas de Liberación Nacional Puertorriqueña
 Guatemalan National Revolutionary Unity
 Los Macheteros – Puerto Rican armed independence movement (ongoing)
 MOVE
 Montoneros,Ejercito Revolucìonario del Pueblo,Peronist Armed Forces of Argentina
 Ñancahuazú Guerrilla
 Paraguayan People's Army (ongoing)
 Popular Revolutionary Army (ongoing)
 Sandinistas
 Shining Path (ongoing)
 Túpac Amaru Revolutionary Movement
 Tupamaros
 Weather Underground
 Zapatistas (ongoing)

Notable individuals in resistance movements

World War II

 Mordechaj Anielewicz
 Josip Broz Tito 
 Dragoljub "Draža" Mihailović 
 Edmund Charaszkiewicz
 Charles de Gaulle
 Mildred Harnack
 Jan Karski
 Henryk Iwański
 Marcel Louette
 Max Manus
 Jean Moulin
 Christian Pineau
 Hannie Schaft
 Aris Velouchiotis
 Mao Zedong
 Chiang Kai-shek
 Sandro Pertini
 Luigi Longo
 Ferruccio Parri
 Witold Pilecki
 Sophie Scholl
 Haile Selassie
 Gunnar Sønsteby

Other resistance movements and figures

 chief Mkwawa of Uhehe
 chief Kimweri of Tanganyika
 Kinjekitile Ng'wale 
 Michel Aoun
 Hassan Nasrallah
 Buenaventura Durruti
 Corazon Aquino
 Giuseppe Garibaldi
 Geronimo
 Ho Chi Minh
 Juan Peron
 Lembitu
 Louis Joseph Papineau
 Nestor Makhno
 Maria Nikiforova
 Osceola
 Red Cloud
 Juba
 Rummu Jüri
 Osman Batur
 Mustafa Kemal Atatürk
 Sant Jarnail Singh Bhindranwale
 Ülo Voitka
 Pancho Villa
 Emiliano Zapata
 Ernesto Guevara
 Abbas al-Musawi
 Russel Means
 Leonard Peltier
 John Brown
 Osama bin Laden
 Cochise
 William Quantrill
 Crazy Horse
 Tecumseh
 Fidel Castro
 Maqbool Bhat
 Vladimir Lenin
 Leon Trotsky
 Sitting Bull
 Mangas Colorado
 Alfred the Great
 El Cid
 Lawrence of Arabia
 Charlemagne Peralte
 Boudica
 King Arthur
 Spartacus
 Charles Martel
 Nat Turner
 Toussaint Louverture
 Jean-Jacques Dessalines
 Sans-Souci
 Nelson Mandela
 William Wallace
 Robert the Bruce
 Little Turtle
 Mahatma Gandhi
 Marvin Heemeyer
 Republic of Rose Island
 Blocking of Telegram in Russia
 List of whistleblowers

See also

 Anti-war
 Anti-capitalism
 Anti-communism
 Anti-fascism
 Anti-imperialism
 Asymmetric warfare
 People's war
 Civil resistance
 Civil rights movement
 Collaborationism (and Collaboration), the opposite of resistance
 Covert cell
 Definitions of terrorism
 Defensivism
 Fictional resistance movements and groups
 Fifth column – clandestine citizen operatives loyal to a foreign government
 Guerrilla warfare
 Insurgency
 Irregular military
 List of guerrillas
 List of revolutions and rebellions
 Nonviolent resistance
 Opposition to the Iraq War
 Opposition to the Vietnam War
 Partisan (military)
 Polish Secret State
 Protesting
 Propaganda
 Reagan Doctrine
 Rebellion
 Resistance Studies Magazine
 Riot
 Social change
 Sniper
 Special Activities Division
 Special Operations Executive
 Unconventional warfare

Citations

General references 
 Gardam, Judith Gail (1993). Non-combatant Immunity as a Norm of International Humanitarian, Martinus Nijhoff. .
 Ticehurst, Rupert. "The Martens Clause and the Laws of Armed Conflict" 30 April 1997, International Review of the Red Cross no. 317, pp. 125–34.

External links